The Hun Sen Cup is the main football knockout tournament in Cambodia. The 2009 Hun Sen Cup was the 3rd season of the Hun Sen Cup, the premier knockout tournament for association football clubs in Cambodia involving Cambodian League and provincial teams organized by the Football Federation of Cambodia.

Phnom Penh Crown were the defending champions, having beaten Preah Khan Reach 1–0 in the previous season's final.

Group stage
The matches were arranged in four regions, two groups in each region. The teams finishing in the top two positions in each of the eight groups in Group stage progressed to the Round of 16 playing in Phnom Penh.

Group A and B in Takéo
Group C and D in Kampong Chhnang
Group E and F in Kampong Cham
Group G and H in Banteay Meanchey

Group A

Group B

Group C

Group D

Group E

Group F

Group G

Group H

Round of 16

Quarter-finals

Semi-finals

Third place play-off

Final

Awards
 Top Goal Scorers: Kouch Sokumpheak of Khemara Keila FC (21 goals)
 Goalkeeper of the Season: Hem Simay of Build Bright United
 Fair Play: Phuchung Neak
Source:

See also
 2009 Cambodian League
 Cambodian League
 Hun Sen Cup

References

Hun Sen Cup seasons
2009 in Cambodian football